The Kemer Cup was a tournament for professional female tennis players played on indoor hard courts. The event was classified as a $50,000 ITF Women's Circuit tournament and was held in Istanbul, Turkey, in 2013.

Past finals

Singles

Doubles

External links 
 ITF search

ITF Women's World Tennis Tour
Hard court tennis tournaments
Tennis tournaments in Turkey
2013 in tennis
2013 in Turkish tennis
2013 in women's tennis
2013 in Turkish women's sport